Open water may refer to:

Ocean or sea waters beyond the coastlines and shorelines of an island or continent
Open Water (film), a 2003 film about a couple that were accidentally left behind by their scuba diving group
Open Water 2: Adrift, 2006 film
Open Water (album), a 2006 album by the German singer Sascha Schmitz
Open-water diving, a place without boundaries where you can dive (sea or lake)
Open Water Diver, a scuba diving certification level provided by several training agencies
Open water swimming, an activity in which people swim in large, outdoor bodies of water such as oceans, bays, lakes and rivers
OpenWater, an application management software
Water (obstacle), open water jump: an obstacle found in the equestrian sport of show jumping
Open Water (novel), 2021 novel by Caleb Azumah Nelson